Capila penicillatum, commomly known as the fringed dawnfly, is a species of hesperid butterfly found in India and Southeast Asia.

Range
The butterfly occurs in India from Meghalaya (Khasi hills) eastwards to Canton, northern Vietnam and Hainan.

The type locality is the Khasi Hills.

Status
It is very rare.

Cited references

References
Print

Watson, E. Y. (1891) Hesperiidae indicae: being a reprint of descriptions of the Hesperiidae of India, Burma, and Ceylon.. Vest and Co. Madras.
Online

Brower, Andrew V. Z. (2007). Capila Moore 1866. Version 4 March 2007 (under construction). http://tolweb.org/Capila/95329/2007.03.04 in The Tree of Life Web Project, http://tolweb.org/

Capila
Butterflies of Asia
Butterflies of Indochina